The Anderson Massif is a prominent ice-covered massif about  across and rising to a height of , located at the junction of Splettstoesser Glacier and Minnesota Glacier in the Heritage Range of the Ellsworth Mountains, Antarctica. It was named by the  Advisory Committee on Antarctic Names for John J. Anderson, a geologist who was field leader of the University of Minnesota Ellsworth Mountains Party, 1961–62.

See also
 Mountains in Antarctica

Geographical features include:

 Bowie Crevasse Field
 Grimes Glacier
 Huggler Peak
 Minnesota Glacier
 Rullman Peak
 Siefker Ridge
 Splettstoesser Glacier

References 

Mountains of Ellsworth Land